is a railway station located in Kagoshima, Kagoshima, Japan. The station opened in 1930.

Lines 
Kyushu Railway Company
Ibusuki Makurazaki Line

JR

Adjacent stations

History
The station was opened on 7 December 1930 by Japanese Government Railways (JGR) as the southern terminus of the then  which it had laid from Nishi-Kagoshima (now ). On 31 October 1963, the line which served the station was renamed the Ibusuki Makurazaki Line. With the privatization of Japanese National Railways (JNR), the successor of JGR, on 1 April 1987, the station came under the control of JR Kyushu.

Nearby places
Hirakawa Zoological Park
Hirakawa Post office

References

Railway stations in Kagoshima Prefecture
Railway stations in Japan opened in 1930